Hyocephalidae are a small family of Heteroptera which are endemic to Australia.

Genera
These two genera make up the family Hyocephalidae.
Hyocephalus Bergroth, 1906
Maevius Stål, 1874

References

 
Heteroptera families
Coreoidea